National Route 370 is a national highway of Japan connecting Kainan, Wakayama and Nara, Nara in Japan, with a total length of 133.2 km (82.77 mi).

Route description
A section of National Route 370 in the town of Kimino in Wakayama Prefecture is a musical road.

References

National highways in Japan
Former toll roads in Japan
Roads in Nara Prefecture
Roads in Wakayama Prefecture
Musical roads in Japan